Islam is the state religion of the People's Republic of Bangladesh.
According to the 2022 census, Bangladesh had a population of about 150 million Muslims, or 91.04% of its total population of  million.
The majority of Bangladeshis are Sunni, and follow the Hanafi school of fiqh. Religion is an integral part of Bangladeshi identity. Despite being a Muslim-majority country, Bangladesh is a de facto secular state.

In the late 7th century, Arab Muslims established commercial as well as religious connection within the region before the conquest, mainly through the coastal regions as traders and primarily via the ports of Chittagong. Region was largely inhabited by different animistic tribes. Arab navigation in the region was the result of the Muslim reign over the Indus delta. In the early 13th century, Muhammad bin Bakhtiyar Khalji conquered Western and part of Northern Bengal, and established the first Muslim kingdom in Bengal. Islamic missionaries in India achieved their greatest success, in terms of number of converts, in Bengal. Sufi's like Shah Jalal are thought to have spread Islam in the north-eastern Bengal and Assam during the beginning of the 12th century. The Islamic Bengal Sultanate, was founded by Shamsuddin Ilyas Shah after its independence from the Tughlaq dynasty. Bengal reached in her golden age during Bengal Sultanate's ruling period. Subsequently, Bengal was conquered by Babur, the founder of one of the gunpowder empires, but was also briefly occupied by the Suri Empire.

Akbar the Great's preaching of the syncretic Din-i Ilahi, was described as a blasphemy by the Qadi of Bengal, which caused huge controversies in South Asia. In the 17th century, under Mughal Emperor Aurangzeb's Islamic sharia-based rule, the Bengal Subah was also known as The Paradise of the Nations. Concepts of the Islamic economics's found in the Fatawa-e-Alamgiri delivered a significant direct contribution to the economy of Bengal, and the Proto-industrialization was signaled.

History

Early explorers 
The Buddhist Pala Empire enjoyed relations with the Arab Abbasid Caliphate. Islam first appeared in Bengal before Pala rule, as a result of increased trade with the early Arab Muslim merchants in places such as the Port of Chittagong. Around this time, the Arab geographer Al-Masudi and author of The Meadows of Gold, travelled to the region where he noticed a Muslim community of inhabitants residing in the region. Other authentications of the Arab traders present in the region was the writings of Arab geographers found on the Meghna River located near Sandwip on the Bay of Bengal. This evidence suggests that the Arab traders had arrived along the Bengal coast long before the Turkic conquest. The Arab writers also knew about the kingdoms of Samrup and Rumi, the latter being identified with the empire of Dharmapal of the Pala Empire. The earliest mosque in South Asia is possibly in Lalmonirhat, built during or just after the Prophet Muhammad's lifetime.

In addition to trade, Islam was also being introduced to the people of Bengal through the migration of missionaries prior to conquest. Arab navigation eastwards was the result of the Muslim reign in North India. The earliest known Sufi missionaries were Syed Shah Surkhul Antia and his students, most notably Shah Sultan Rumi, who arrived in 1053 CE. Rumi settled in present-day Netrokona, Mymensingh where he influenced the local ruler and population to embrace Islam.

The first Muslim conquest of Bengal was undertaken by the forces of General Bakhtiyar Khilji in the thirteenth century. This opened the doors for Muslim influence in the region for hundreds of years up until the present-day. Many of the people of Bengal began accepting Islam through the influx of missionaries following this conquest. Sultan Balkhi and Shah Makhdum Rupos settled in the present-day Rajshahi Division in northern Bengal, preaching to the communities there. Numerous small sultanates emerged in the region. During the reign of the Sultan of Lakhnauti Shamsuddin Firuz Shah, much of present-day Satgaon, Sonargaon and Mymensingh came under Muslim dominion. A community of 13 Muslim families headed by Burhanuddin resided in the northeastern city of Srihatta (Sylhet), claiming their descendants to have arrived from Chittagong. Srihatta (Sylhet) was ruled by an oppressive king called Gour Govinda. After being informed of Raja Gour Govinda's oppressive regime in Sylhet, Firuz Shah sent numerous forces led by his nephew Sikandar Khan Ghazi and subsequently his military commander-in-chief Syed Nasiruddin to conquer Sylhet. By 1303, over three hundred Sufi preachers led by Shah Jalal aided the conquest and confirmed a victory. Following the conquest, Jalal disseminated his followers across different parts of Bengal to spread Islam. Jalal is now a household name among Muslims in Bangladesh.

As independent Sultanate of Bengal 

During the Sultanate period, a syncretic belief system arose due to mass conversions. As a result, the Islamic concept of tawhid (the oneness of God) was diluted into the veneration of saints or pirs. Deities such as Shitala (goddess of smallpox), Olabibi (goddess of cholera) and Manasa (goddess of snakes) became venerated as pirs.

Under Mughal Empire
In pre-Mughal times, there is less evidence for widespread adoption of Islam in what is now Bangladesh. What mention of Muslims there was usually in reference to an urban elite. Ibn Battuta met with Shah Jalal in Sylhet and noted the inhabitants of the plains were still Hindu. In 1591, Venetian traveller Cesare Federici mentioned Sondwip near Chittagong as having an entirely Muslim population. The seventeenth century European travellers generally understood Islam as being implanted after the Mughal conquest.

During the Mughal Empire, much of the region of what is now East Bengal was still heavily forested, but highly fertile. The Mughals incentivised the bringing of this land under cultivation, and so peasants were incentivised to bring the land under cultivation. These peasants were primarily led by Muslim leaders and so Islam became the main religion in the delta. Most of the Zamindars in the modern Barisal division, for instance, were upper caste Hindus who subcontracted actual jungle clearance work to a Muslim pir. In other instances, pirs themselves would organise the locals to clear the jungle and then contact the Mughals to gain legitimacy. In other instances, such as the densely-forested interior of Chittagong, Muslims came from indigenous tribals who never followed Hindu rituals.

In British India

The British East India Company was given the right to collect revenue from Bengal and Bihar by the Treaty of Allahabad after defeating the combined armies of Nawab Mir Qasim of Bengal, Nawab of Awadh, and Mughal emperor at the Battle of Buxar. They annexed Bengal in 1793 after abolishing local rule (Nizamat). The British looted the Bengal treasury, appropriating wealth valued at US$40 billion in modern-day prices. Due to high colonial taxation, Bengali commerce shrank by 50% within 40 years, while at the same time British imports flooded the market. Spinners and weavers starved during famines and Bengal's once industrious cities became impoverished. The East India Company forced opium and indigo cultivation and the permanent settlement dismantled centuries of joint Muslim-Hindu political, military and feudal cooperation.

The Bengal Presidency was established in 1765. Rural eastern Bengal witnessed the earliest rebellions against British rule, including the Faraizi movement led by Haji Shariatullah and the activities of Titumir. The mutiny of 1857 engulfed much of northern India and Bengal, including in Dhaka and Chittagong. Following the end of the mutiny, the British Government took direct control of Bengal from the East India Company and instituted the British Raj. The influence of Christian missionaries increased during this period. To counter this trend, Reazuddin Ahmad Mashadi, Muhammad Reazuddin Ahmad of the Sudhakar newspaper and Munshi Mohammad Meherullah played prominent roles.

The colonial capital Calcutta, where Bengali Muslims formed the second largest community, became the second largest city in the British Empire after London. The late 19th and early 20th-century Indian Renaissance brought dramatic social and political change. The introduction of Western law, government and education introduced modern enlightenment values which created a new politically conscious middle class and a new generation of leaders in science, politics and the arts. Sir Syed Ahmed Khan pioneered English education among British Indian Muslims, with many Bengali Muslims enrolling in Aligarh Muslim University. The First Partition of Bengal incubated the broader anti-colonial struggle and in 1906 the All India Muslim League was formed during the Muhammadan Education Conference in Dhaka. During this period a Muslim middle class emerged and the University of Dhaka played a role at the beginning of the emancipation of Bengali Muslim society, which was also marked by the emergence progressive groups like the Freedom of Intellect Movement and the Muslim Literary Society. Bengali Muslims were at the forefront of the Indian Independence Movement, including the Pakistan Movement.

Bangladesh War of Independence

Islamic sentiments powered the definition of nationhood in the 1940s when Bengali people united with Muslims in other parts of the subcontinent to form Pakistan. Defining themselves first as Muslims they envisaged a society based on Islamic principles. However, by the beginning of the 1970s the Bengalis were more swayed by regional feelings, in which they defined themselves foremost as Bengali Muslims before being Muslims. The society they then envisioned was based on principles such as socialism, nationalism and democracy. While Islam was still a part of faith and culture, it was no longer the only factor that formed national identity.

Bangladesh was established as a constitutionally secular state and the Bangladeshi constitution enshrined secular,socialist and democratic principles.

Denominations

The majority of Muslims in Bangladesh are Sunni, although other Muslim demographics within Bangladesh include Shiites, Quranists, Ahmadis, Mahdavia and non-denominational Muslims.

Sunni
As with the rest of the Indian subcontinent, the majority of Muslims in Bangladesh are traditional Sunni, who mainly follow the Hanafi school of jurisprudence (madh'hab) and consequently the Maturidi school of theology. They are divided into Barelvi and Deobandi. Majority of the madaaris, also known as Qawmi Madrassa in the country are run by Deobandis. Non-traditional Sunnis who are not Hanafi such as the Salafi or Wahhabi have a significant community in Bangladesh and are known as Ahl-e-Hadith. There are others such as Jamaat-e-Islami, a political party similar to Muslim Brotherhood in promoting Islamism.

Sufism
A majority of Bangladeshi Muslims perceive Sufis as a source of spiritual wisdom and guidance and their khanqahs and dargahs as nerve centers of Muslim society
and according to an estimate approximately 26% of Bangladeshi Muslims openly identify themselves with a Sufi order, almost half of whom adhere to the Chishti order that became popular during the Mughal times, although the earliest Sufis in Bengal, such as Shah Jalal, belonged to the Suhrawardiyya order, whose global center is still Maner Sharif in Bihar. During the Sultanate period, Sufis emerged and formed khanqahs and dargahs that served as the nerve center of local communities. The tradition of Islamic mysticism known as Sufism appeared very early in Sunni Islam and became essentially a popular movement emphasizing worship out of a love of Allah. Sufism stresses a direct, unstructured, personal devotion to God in place of the ritualistic, outward observance of the faith and "a Sufi aims to attain spiritual union with God through love". An important belief in the Sufi tradition is that the average believer may use spiritual guides in his pursuit of the truth. Throughout the centuries many gifted scholars and numerous poets have been inspired by Sufi ideas and the Baul musical tradition of Bengal has also been influenced by Sufism.

The Chishti Order, Qadiriyya, Shadhili, Suhrawardiyya, Maizbhandaria, Naqshbandi, Mujaddidi, Ahmadi, Mohammadi and Rifai orders were among the most widespread Sufi orders in Bangladesh in the late 1980s. The Barelvi, who support Sufism, outnumber the Deobandi in Bangladesh and South Asia although not all ordinary Barelvi adherents formally join a Sufi order.

According to FirstPost, Sufis have suffered from religious sectarianism, with fourteen Sufis murdered by Islamist extremists from December 2014 to June 2016.

Revivalism
Before the 19th century, Bangladeshi Muslims practiced a very syncretic version of Islam. This included Muharram processions that included immersion of tazias, as well as other ideas such as birth pollution or even celebration of certain Hindu religious festivals. In the early 19th century, a large number of more fundamentalist and Wahabi-influenced preachers would return to abolish these customs from Muslim religious life. Some of these preachers included Titmur, Haji Shariatullah, as well as several disciples of Sayyid Ahmad Barelvi such as Muhammad Ali and Wilayat Ali. They forbade customs such as offering of sweets to tombs of dead ancestors, worship of pirs, as well as the playing of music at weddings, viewing them all as corrupting influences of Hinduism. Many of these movements also unified and empowered Muslim peasantry with their preaching of equality of all Muslims, to the extent that many of these movements also led the peasants against the Zamindars and the British.

The influence of conservative Sunni Islam 'revivalism' has been noted by some. On 5 May 2013 a demonstration organized by the Deobandi organization known as the Hefazat-e-Islam movement paralyzed the city of Dhaka when half a million people demanded the institution of a conservative religious program, to include a ban on mixing of men and women in public places, the removal of sculptures and demands for the retention of "absolute trust and faith in Almighty Allah" in the preamble of the constitution of Bangladesh. In 2017 author K. Anis Ahmed complained that attacks on and killings of liberal bloggers, academics and religious minorities, had been brought about by "a significant shift ... in the past few decades" up to 2017 in attitudes towards religion in Bangladesh.
During my school years in the 1980s, religion was a matter of personal choice. No one batted an eyelid if you chose not to fast during Ramadan. Today, eat in public during the holiday and you may be chided by strangers. Thanks to shows on cable TV, social media and group meetings, Islamists have succeeded to an alarming degree in painting secularism as a threat to Islam.

Ahmed and others also attacked the deletion of non-Muslim writers in the new 2017 primary school textbooks, alleging they were dropped "per the demand" of Hefajat-e Islam and the Awami Olema League who had demanded "the exclusion of some of the poems written by `Hindus and atheists`". These changes, as well as such errors as spelling mistakes and the incorrect arrangement of paragraphs, triggered newspaper headlines and protests on social media. According to Prof. Akhtaruzzaman, head of the textbook committee, the omissions happened "mainly because the NCTB did the job in such a hurry that the authors and the editors got little time to go through the texts." The Primary and Mass Education Minister Mostafizur Rahman has promised the errors will be corrected.

There have also been attacks on Sufi preachers and personalities by puritanical/revivalist groups.

Small minorities

There are also few Shi'a Muslims, particularly belonging to the Bihari community. The Shi'a observance commemorating the martyrdom of Ali's sons, Hasan and Husayn, are still widely observed by the nation's Sunnis, even though there are small numbers of Shi'as. Among the Shias, the Dawoodi Bohra community is concentrated in Chittagong.

There are no adherents of the Kharijite sect in Bangladesh except foreigners such as Omani diplomats and workers at Omani missions residing in Bangladesh. Muslims who reject the authority of hadith, known as Quranists, are present in Bangladesh, though having not expressed publicly but are active virtually due to fear of gruesome persecution considering the present political situation. The Ahmadiyya community, which is widely considered to be non-Muslim by mainstream Muslim leaders, is estimated to be around 100,000, the community has faced discrimination because of their beliefs and have been persecuted in some areas. There is a very small community of Bangladeshis whom are adherents to the Mahdavia creed. There are some people who do not identify themselves with any sect and just call themselves Muslims. They are known as non-denominational Muslims and are few in numbers although many Sunnis in Bangladesh also call themselves Muslims only and do not emphasize themselves being Sunni.

Demography

The population of Bangladesh have gone up from 28.92 million in 1901 to 150.36 million in 2022, as per as statistics the same way the high fertility rate among Muslims have led to over population of the country as according to census, Muslim population have gone up from 19.12 million in 1901 to 150.36 million in 2022. The Muslim percentage have also got increased from 66.1% in 1901 to 91.04% in 2022.

The Muslim population in Bangladesh is 150,360,404 covering up 91.04% of Bangladesh population as per 2022 census.

Estimation shows that over 1 million Rohingya Muslim refugees live in Bangladesh who have came here during the period of (2016–17) crisis. On 28 September 2018, at the 73rd United Nations General Assembly, Bangladeshi Prime Minister Sheikh Hasina said there are 1.1-1.3 million Rohingya refugees now in Bangladesh.

According to Pew research center, Muslim population of Bangladesh will reach 218.5-237.5 million by the year 2050, and will constitute overwhelming 95% of the country's population, thus making the country 4th largest Muslim populated around that time.

While Analyzing the division wise data for 2022 Religious Population, it was found that the highest number of Muslims resides in Mymensingh division (95.54 percent), while the lowest resides in Sylhet (86.17 percent).

Percentage of Muslims in Bangladesh by decades

Islamic culture in Bangladesh 

Although Islam played a significant role in the life and culture of the people, religion did not dominate national politics because Islam was not the central component of national identity. When in June 1988 an "Islamic way of life" was proclaimed for Bangladesh by constitutional amendment, very little attention was paid outside the intellectual class to the meaning and impact of such an important national commitment. However, most observers believed that the declaration of Islam as the state religion might have a significant impact on national life. Aside from arousing the suspicion of the non-Islamic minorities, it could accelerate the proliferation of religious parties at both the national and the local levels, thereby exacerbating tension and conflict between secular and religious politicians. Unrest of this nature was reported on some college campuses soon after the amendment was promulgated.

Islamic architecture in Bangladesh

Mosques 

Bangladesh has a vast amount of historic mosques with its own Islamic architecture.
 Abu Aqqas Mosque-648
 Shahbaz Khan Mosque-1679
 Shona Mosque-1493
 Bagha Mosque-1523
 Khan Mohammad Mridha Mosque-1703
 Sixty Dome Mosque -15th century

Modern mosques

Tombs and mausoleums 
Lalbagh Fort-1664

Law and politics

Legal issues
In Bangladesh, where a modified Anglo-Indian civil and criminal legal system operates, there are no official sharia courts. Most Muslim marriages, however, are presided over by the qazi, a traditional Muslim judge whose advice is also sought on matters of personal law, such as inheritance, divorce, and the administration of religious endowments.

The inheritance rights of Muslim in Bangladesh are governed by The Muslim Personal Law (Shariat) Application Act (1937) and The Muslim Family Laws Ordinance (1961). Article 2 of The Muslim Personal Law Application Act provides that questions related to succession and inheritance are governed by Muslim Personal Law (Shariat).
Article 2 proclaims: "any custom or usage to the contrary, in all questions (save questions relating to agricultural land) regarding intestate succession, special property of females, including personal property inherited or obtained under contract or gift or any other provision of Personal Law, marriage, dissolution of marriage, including talaq, ila, zihar, lian, khula and mubaraat, maintenance, dower, guardianship, gifts, trusts and trust properties, and waqfs (other than charities and charitable institutions and charitable and religious endowments) the rule of decision in cases where the parties are Muslims shall be the Muslim Personal Law (Shariat)."

Political issues
Post-1971 regimes sought to increase the role of the government in the religious life of the people. The Ministry of Religious Affairs provided support, financial assistance, and endowments to religious institutions, including mosques and community prayer grounds (idgahs). The organization of Hajj also came under the auspices of the ministry because of limits on the number of pilgrims admitted by the government of Saudi Arabia and the restrictive foreign exchange regulations of the government of Bangladesh. The ministry also directed the policy and the program of the Islamic Foundation Bangladesh, which was responsible for organizing and supporting research and publications on Islamic subjects. The foundation also maintains the Baitul Mukarram (National Mosque), and organized the training of imams. Some 18,000 imams were scheduled for training once the government completed establishment of a national network of Islamic cultural centers and mosque libraries. Under the patronage of the Islamic Foundation, an encyclopedia of Islam in the Bengali language was being compiled in the late 1980s.

Another step toward further government involvement in religious life was taken in 1984 when the semiofficial Zakat Fund Committee was established under the chairmanship of the president of Bangladesh. The committee solicited annual zakat contributions on a voluntary basis. The revenue so generated was to be spent on orphanages, schools, children's hospitals, and other charitable institutions and projects. Commercial banks and other financial institutions were encouraged to contribute to the fund. Through these measures the government sought closer ties with religious establishments within the country and with Islamic countries such as Saudi Arabia and Pakistan.

Leaders and organizations

The members of the Ulama include Mawlānā, Imams, Ulama and Muftis. The first two titles are accorded to those who have received special training in Islamic theology and law. A maulvi has pursued higher studies in a madrassa, a school of religious education attached to a mosque. Additional study on the graduate level leads to the title Mawlānā.

Educational institutions
The madrassas are also ideologically divided in two mainstreams.The Ali'a Madrassa which has its roots in Aligarh Movement of Sir Syed Ahmed Khan Bahadur and the other one is Qawmi Madarassa.

Status of religious freedom 

The Constitution establishes Islam as the state religion but upholds the right to practice—subject to law, public order, and morality—the religion of one's choice. The Government generally respects this provision in practice. The Government (2001–2006) led by an alliance of four parties Bangladesh Nationalist Party, Jamaat-e-Islami Bangladesh, Islami Oikya Jote and Bangladesh Jatiyo Party banned Ahmadiya literature by an executive order. However, the present government, led by Bangladesh Awami League strongly propagates secularism and respect towards other religions. Despite all Bangladeshis saying that religion is an important part of their daily lives, Bangladesh's Awami League won a landslide victory in 2008 on a platform of secularism, reform, and a suppression of radical Islamist groups. According to a Gallup poll conducted in 2009, simultaneous strong support of the secular Awami League and the near unanimous importance of religion in daily life suggests that while religion is vital in Bangladeshis' daily lives, they appear comfortable with its lack of influence in government.

In Bangladesh, the International Crimes Tribunal tried and convicted several leaders of the Islamic Razakar militias, as well as Bangladesh Muslim Awami league (Forid Uddin Mausood), of war crimes committed against Hindus during the 1971 Bangladesh genocide. The charges included forced conversion of Bengali Hindus to Islam.

See also

 Islam in West Bengal
 Islam in Pakistan
 Islam in Myanmar
 Islam in India
 Islam in South Asia
 Islam by country

References

External links
 
 
 Development Cooperation and Islamic values in Bangladesh
 US State Department Bangladesh

 
Bangladesh